Arthur Duncan (1933–2023, American tap dancer.

Arthur Duncan may also refer to:
Art Duncan (1891–1975), Canadian ice hockey player, coach, and general manager, and World War I fighter ace
Arthur Duncan (English cricketer) (1856–1936), English cricketer
Arthur Duncan (New Zealand cricketer) (1860–1911), New Zealand cricketer
Arthur Duncan (Australian footballer) (1913–1991), Australian rules footballer
Arthur Duncan (footballer, born 1947), Scottish footballer
Arthur Duncan (golfer) (1875–1951), New Zealand golfer and businessman
Little Arthur Duncan (1934–2008), American blues harmonica player